Claudia Bellotto (born 9 July 1960) is an Argentine former swimmer. She competed in four events at the 1976 Summer Olympics.

References

1960 births
Living people
Argentine female swimmers
Olympic swimmers of Argentina
Swimmers at the 1976 Summer Olympics
Place of birth missing (living people)